Roney "Giah" Giacometti (born 11 August 1974) is a Brazilian film director, composer and music producer, CEO and founder of Doiddo Films.

Biography 
Born in a family fascinated by music, Roney Giah started studying and playing the guitar at 6 years old. His first band came when he was 9, encouraged by his teacher and mentor, Manuel dos Santos. His first compositions came when he was 11 years old. 
But it was only with his second band, Moscou Capitalista (Capitalist Moscow) that Roney started playing at music festivals and made his first studio recording in 1988. The band split up four years later, making place for Quelidon, power trio consisted of Roney (voice and guitar), Rolon (bass), and Sil (drums).

In 1993, Giah traveled to the United States to study music at the Musicians Institute in Los Angeles. There, he studied with Pat Metheny, Scott Henderson, Frank Gambale, Joe Diorio, Joe Pass, Stanley Jordan, Jenifer Batten (Michael Jackson's former guitar player), and Cat Gray (Prince's former keyboard player).

Back to Brazil in 1994, and after two years of concerts, the singer, guitar player and composer, recorded his debut album, Semente (Seed), in 1996, at the Bebop Studio. The CD was largely instrumental and was nominated for Brazil's 1998 Sharp Award.

Also in 1998, he was finalist at Brazil's Visa Instrumental Award and won a second place at the Berklee / Souza Lima Festival, in São Paulo.

Roney Giah's second algum, the CD Mais Dias na Terra (Extra days on Earth), had its official launching on 29 April 2006 in a sold out concert at the theater of Museu da Imagem e do Som (MIS) in São Paulo. Mais dias na Terra (Extra days on Earth) was also pre-selected for 2006 Brazilian Tim Award and Latin Grammy 2006.

In 2008, The John Lennon Songwriting Contest, created by Yoko Ono with judges such as Carlos Santana, Wyclef Jean, John Legend, Fergie, Al Jareau, Bob Weir, and Lamont Dozier gave Honorable Mention in World category for the song Amar com E, from Giah's second CD, More Days on Earth.

Also in 2008, Giah signed a record deal with British Label ASTRANOVA for the release of a CD compilation entitled Yesterday's tomorrow. Featuring seven tracks from Semente – Seed – (1998), six tracks from Mais dias na Terra − More days on Earth − (2006), and one bonus track exclusively produced for the compilation, ASTRANOVA released podcast shows in 107 countries. The record company's interest started when Roney Giah's compositions "Amar Com E" and "A Chuva" were selected for garageband.com's Track of the Day, which is an American site that has Sir George Martin, Beatles former producer, as chairman of their advisory board.

In addition to the compilation, Giah's composition Translate the world was featured on the soundtrack of the American production No Pain, No Gain, a movie exhibited in 250 movie theaters in the United States and worldwide.

In 2009, Roney Giah won Honorable Mention in The Billboard World Song Contest for his composition "Time is so still", from Giah's fourth work, the pop chamber-inspired album Queimando a moleira (Burning mind).

In 2010, Roney Giah was nominated for best independent artist in the Australian-based The MusicOz Award.

In 2011, Giah's fifth album, Co'as goela e tudo ("Nothing but the Throats"), recorded entirely a cappella with Brazilian vocal group Perseptom was released.

Since 2007, Roney Giah has been producing TVC's soundtracks for brands such as Colgate, HSBC, Pringles, Mattel, Zorba, Bank of America, AOC for the main agencies of the market. In 2014, Giah founded Doiddo Films, Animation & VFX (www.doiddo.com) expanding his know-how to the film production industry. As a commercial director he has worked for agencies like WMcCann, Young & Rubicam, Havas WW, Talent Marcel and Mullen Lowe Brazil for brands such as NET, Nestle, ASICS, Kaiser, TNT Energy Drink, Merck Sharp & Dohme, Shopping D, among others. 

In 2016, Roney Giah won both gold and silver Lions Cannes for 'Parkinsounds" video case.

In 2017, Giah won silver Lions Cannes in Entertainment for music. 

In 2018, Giah was chosen by FOX Channel to direct and produce DOIDDO Films Animated series "Little God's Little School"

Discography
– CD Semente (Seed) – 1997 
– CD Mais dias na Terra (Extra days on earth) – 2005 
– CD Yesterday's tomorrow – 2008 
– CD Queimando a moleira (Burning mind) – 2010 
– CD Co'as goela e tudo (Nothing but the throats) – 2011
– CD (+ Vynil Compact) Single puzzle piece vol. 01- 2012
– CD (+ Vynil Compact) Pop em pedaço vol. 01 – 2012
– CD (+ Vynil Compact) Pop em pedaço vol. 02 – 2014

Career highlights

In music:
– Second (Runner up) Best World/Folk album of the year (CARAs – Contemporary A cappella Recording Awards, 2011) for his CD Nothing but the throats.
– Suggested Artist Honors at the Song of the year Songwriting Contest (2011).
– Nominated for Best international artist (The Musicoz Award, 2010).
– Honorable Mention in World category for the song "Amar com E" from Giah’s second CD, Extra days on Earth (The John Lennon Songwriting Contest, 2008).
– Pre-selected for the 2006 TIM Music Award (CD Extra days on Earth).
– Pre-selected for the 2006 Latin Grammy (CD Extra days on Earth).
– Honorable Mention for the composition "Time is so still" (Billboard World Song Contest, 2009).
– Honorable Mention for the composition "Time is so still" (Mike Pinder’s Song Wars, 2010).
– Giah’s composition “Time is so Still” (from his fourth CD Burning mind) was featured on over 160 college radios in the USA and has reached the top 30 charts twice (2011).
– Roney Giah’s composition "Translate the World" was featured on the soundtrack of the American production No Pain, No Gain − a movie shown in over 250 movie theaters in the United States and worldwide.
– Roney Giah’s debut album Semente (Seed) was nominated for the Sharp Award (1998).
– As a guitarist, he was a finalist at the 1998 Visa Instrumental Award and won a second place at the Berklee / Souza Lima Festival in his hometown São Paulo.

In advertisement Film:

Cannes Festival:
– Lion Cannes 2016 (Gold)
– Lion Cannes 2016 (Silver)
– Lion Cannes 2017 (Silver)

Clio Award
– Clio Award 2016 (Gold)
– Clio Award 2016 (Gold)
– Clio Award 2016 (Silver)

References

External links 
 Roney Giah Official Website

1975 births
Living people
People from São José dos Campos
Brazilian people of Italian descent
Brazilian male guitarists
Musicians from São Paulo (state)
Musicians Institute alumni
21st-century guitarists
21st-century male musicians